Cork Caucus (20 June 2005 to 11 July 2005) was an interdisciplinary meeting of 60 to 80 artists, thinkers, writers, philosophers and other creative individuals, held in Cork, Ireland. The caucus investigated cultural, political and artistic issues.

Organisation 
The Cork Caucus project was devised by the National Sculpture Factory as part of Cork's tenure as European Capital of Culture in 2005, and was curated by Charles Esche, Annie Fletcher, and Art/not art (David Dobz O'Brien and Fergal Gaynor). In addition to lectures and exhibitions, the organisers also coordinated two outdoor public events.

Participants and supporters
The origins of the project date to at least early 2004 when Charles Esche, director and curator of the Van Abbemuseum in Eindhoven, visited Cork. Fergal Gaynor, who was one of the co-curators of the project, was also a co-organiser of the SoundEye Festival and the 2009 festival The Avant: Ten Days of the Progressive Arts. Other participants in the Cork Caucus events included Vito Acconci, Maria Eichhorn, Bik Van der Pol, Sarat Maharaj, Chantal Mouffe and Gayatri Chakravorty Spivak.

Cork Caucus was funded by organisations including the European Cultural Foundation, Arts Council England, British Council and Danish Arts Council's Committee for International Visual Art.

References

Notes

Sources

 
 
  (Graphic editors Can Altay and David (Dobz) O'Brien).

External links
 Original Cork Caucus site (archived 2011)
 Corkcaucus.ie website

Culture in Cork (city)
Irish artist groups and collectives
2005 in Ireland
June 2005 events in Europe
July 2005 events in Europe
Arts events
Events in the Republic of Ireland